Yves Devillers (born 18 August 1948) is a French sailor who competed in the 1972 Summer Olympics.

References

1948 births
Living people
French male sailors (sport)
Olympic sailors of France
Sailors at the 1972 Summer Olympics – Tempest
Place of birth missing (living people)
20th-century French people